The 2015 TCR International Series Portimão round was the fourth round of the 2015 TCR International Series season. It took place on 10 May at the Algarve International Circuit.

Nicki Thiim won the first race, starting from pole position, driving an Audi TT Cup and Michel Nykjær gained the second one, driving a SEAT León Cup Racer.

Success Ballast
Due to the results obtained in the previous round, Pepe Oriola received +30 kg, Stefano Comini +20 kg and Michel Nykjær +10 kg.

Classification

Qualifying

Race 1

Race 2

Notes:
 — Mikhail Grachev was moved to the back of the grid because of a parc fermé infringement.

Standings after the event

Drivers' Championship standings

Teams' Championship standings

 Note: Only the top five positions are included for both sets of drivers' standings.

References

External links
TCR International Series official website

Portimao
TCR International Series